Thomas Michael McKeown (24 January 1869 – 25 October 1903) was a Scottish footballer who played for Hibernian, Celtic, Blackburn Rovers and Scotland.

References

External links

The Celtic Wiki profile

1869 births
1903 deaths
Scottish footballers
English Football League players
Blackburn Rovers F.C. players
Footballers from East Ayrshire
Hibernian F.C. players
Celtic F.C. players
Scotland international footballers
Association football fullbacks
Scottish Football League players
Place of death missing